Omanitherium (meaning Oman beast) is a genus of an extinct genus of barytheriid proboscidean that lived during the early Oligocene in Oman. It belongs to the family Barytheriidae, which represented the first large size proboscideans to appear in the fossil record and were characterized by a strong sexual dimorphism.

References 

Oligocene proboscideans
Prehistoric placental genera
Fossil taxa described in 2012